Oberkappel is a municipality in the district of Rohrbach in the state of Upper Austria.

Population

Geography
Oberkappel has an area of 12 km². The municipality is located in the north of the state of Upper Austria. It borders on Germany and is very close to the Czech Republic.

Sports and recreation
The European walking routes E8 and E10 run through this place. The E8 runs from Ireland via, among others, the Netherlands (called Oeverloperpad and Lingepad in the Netherlands) through Germany, the north of Austria and Slovakia to the borders of Poland and the Ukraine, and also includes a section in Bulgaria, with the future target Istanbul in Turkey. The E10 comes from Lapland and runs via Finland, the former GDR, the Czech Republic and Austria to Bozen/Bolzano in northern Italy; There are plans to extend the route via France and the Spanish east coast to Gibraltar.

History 
The town was originally part of the Hochstift Passau. According to the Land Registry of Rannariedl in 1581, Oberkappel belonged to the parish Wegscheid. In 1783 it became independent as a parish. During the secularization of 1803, the place with most of the Hochstiftischen area fell into the hands of Archduke Ferdinand of Tuscany and his electorate of Salzburg. The place then came to Bavaria in 1805. Oberkappel has belonged to Upper Austria since 1814 and has been a border town with Bavaria ever since. During the Third Reich, the town belonged to the Gau Oberdonau. During World War II Oberkappel was the place where Allied troops first entered Austrian territory.

Well-known Oberkappellers 
 Franz R. Friedl (1892–1977), composer
 Kurt Krenn (1936–2014), bishop

References

Cities and towns in Rohrbach District